Fulton Ferry may refer to:
Fulton Ferry (ferry), a former ferry connecting Manhattan's and Brooklyn's Fulton Streets
Fulton Ferry Company, which operated the Fulton Ferry
Fulton Ferry, Brooklyn, the neighborhood around the former ferry landing
Fulton Slip, Brooklyn, the Ferry slip in Fulton Ferry, Brooklyn, the docking facility of the Fulton Ferry 
Fulton Slip, Manhattan, the former ferry landing in Manhattan, now part of the South Street Seaport
Empire-Fulton Ferry State Park, another name for Brooklyn Bridge Park on the Brooklyn side
Fulton Ferry (BMT Fulton Street Line), a station on the demolished BMT Fulton Street Line in Brooklyn that closed in 1940

See also
Fulton Street (Manhattan)
Fulton Street (Brooklyn)
Bleecker Street Line, originally the Bleecker Street and Fulton Ferry Railroad, chartered 1864, the last horse car line in New York City, not replaced with a trolley line or bus route when it was abandoned in 1917
Robert Fulton (1765–1815), an American engineer and inventor widely credited with developing a commercially successful steamboat, after whom the ferry was named